Paolo Romeo (born 20 February 1938) is a cardinal and archbishop emeritus of Palermo. He was appointed to the see of Palermo by Pope Benedict XVI on 19 December 2006.

Romeo was the fifth of nine children. After primary school he entered the seminary and began studying theology.

His bishop sent him to Rome in 1959 to complete his academic studies and he achieved the licentiate in theology at the Gregorian University and a doctorate in canon law at the Pontifical Lateran University.

He was ordained on 18 March 1961 at the chapel of the Episcopal Seminary of Acireale, he was incardinated in the Diocese of Acireale. He continued his studies at the university and did pastoral ministry as assistant to the Scouts Group "Roma IX" in "Collegio San Giuseppe in Piazza di Spagna" and diocesan assistant of the association "Silenziosi Operai della Croce".

Diplomatic work
In 1964, he was admitted to the Pontifical Ecclesiastical Academy and on 1 January 1967 he entered the diplomatic service of the Holy See. Romeo worked in the nunciatures in the Philippines, Belgium and Luxembourg and European Community, Venezuela, and Rwanda and Burundi. In 1967, he was called to the Council for Public Affairs of the Church in the Secretariat of State. At the same time, he worked as director of the "Casa Internazionale del Clero" and was regional assistant for the Lazio of the AGESC.

In 1976 he was recalled to the Vatican Secretariat of State to monitor the life of the Catholic community in the countries of Latin America and activities of the Latin American Episcopal Conference, especially at that time which involved preparation for the 3rd General Conference of that continent which opened on 29 January 1979.

On 17 December 1983 he was appointed Titular Archbishop of Vulturia by Pope John Paul II and that same day was appointed Apostolic Nuncio to Haiti.  Romeo stayed in Haiti until his appointment to serve as Nuncio in Colombia in April 1990. On 5 February 1999 he was appointed Nuncio to Canada.

Archbishop of Palermo

On 17 April 2001 was named to represent the Holy See in Italy and San Marino. Pope Benedict XVI appointed Archbishop Romeo to serve as the Metropolitan Archbishop of Palermo on 19 December 2006, replacing Salvatore De Giorgi, who had reached the retirement age of 75 in September 2005. In 2005 Archbishop Romeo was awarded Knight Grand Cross of the Order of Merit of the Italian Republic. Archbishop Romeo received the pallium in St. Peter's Basilica in the Vatican on 29 June 2007 from Pope Benedict along with 45 other metropolitan archbishops. Archbishop Romeo was elected president of the Sicilian Episcopal Conference on 14 February 2007.

He was created Cardinal-Priest of Santa Maria Odigitria at a consistory on 20 November 2010 and was eligible to vote in a papal conclave until his 80th birthday in 2018. He was one of the cardinal electors who participated in the 2013 papal conclave that selected Pope Francis.

In December 2010 he was appointed a member of the Pontifical Council for the Laity. On 3 October 2010 he welcomed Pope Benedict when he visited the Sicilian capital. Cardinal Romeo is Sicilian Grand Prior of the Lieutenancy of the Equestrian Order of the Holy Sepulchre of Jerusalem. At age 75 he submitted his resignation letter to Pope Francis, which was accepted on 27 October 2015.

References

External links
 

1938 births
Living people
People from Acireale
Roman Catholic archbishops of Palermo
Apostolic Nuncios to Colombia
Apostolic Nuncios to Canada
Pontifical Ecclesiastical Academy alumni
Almo Collegio Capranica alumni
Pontifical Gregorian University alumni
Pontifical Lateran University alumni
21st-century Italian cardinals
20th-century Italian Roman Catholic titular archbishops
Cardinals created by Pope Benedict XVI
20th-century Italian cardinals
Knights Grand Cross of the Order of Merit of the Italian Republic
Apostolic Nuncios to Italy
Apostolic Nuncios to San Marino
Apostolic Nuncios to Haiti
Members of the Order of the Holy Sepulchre
21st-century Italian Roman Catholic archbishops